Paige Crosland Anderson is an abstract painter from the United States.

Career
In 2011, Anderson obtained a BFA from Brigham Young University (BYU) as a valedictorian and was named a commencement speaker. Known for her geometric paintings that invoke pioneer quilts and Mormon culture. After graduating from BYU, Anderson gained representation and then began to show work in a number of galleries and shows.

The themes of Anderson's work included quilts, geometric shapes, patterns, endlessness, and eternity.
Anderson explains, "Pioneer quilt patterns are symbols of my cultural heritage. Not only I am the descendant of Mormon pioneers who crossed the plains but also my grandmother Donna was an expert quilter. Quilting is work that reveals its toil only on close inspection. That is the way I want my artwork to be. I believe it's a metaphor for a life well-lived. In my art-making process, I paint the same pattern several times in different colors until there are an indiscernible number of underlayers. The viewer may only see hints of the effort that is behind the final product but that is intentional. The layers, the repetition, the colors, and the pattern itself are all avenues by which my work could be accessed by the viewer."

Awards
Anderson was a Purchase Award winner at the 10th International Art Competition, Tell Me The Stories of Jesus, a juried exhibition at the Church History Museum in Salt Lake City, Utah. She received Honorable Mention from the annual Zion Art Competition in 2016. She was selected honorable mention at the 96th Annual Spring Salon, a juried exhibition at the Springville Art Museum in Springville, Utah.

Personal life
Anderson grew up in Provo, Utah and lives in Salt Lake City, Utah. She is a member of the Church of Jesus Christ of Latter-day Saints and is married with two daughters. She and her husband previously lived in Washington, D.C. and Bologna, Italy.

References

External links
 Paige Crosland Anderson Official website
 Artful: Brian Kershisnik and Paige Anderson BYU TV Interview

Living people
21st-century American painters
21st-century American women artists
Painters from Utah
Latter Day Saints from Utah
Brigham Young University alumni
Year of birth missing (living people)
People from Provo, Utah
American Latter Day Saint artists
Artists from Utah